The 45th annual Berlin International Film Festival was held from 9 to 22 February 1995. The Golden Bear was awarded to French film The Bait directed by Bertrand Tavernier. The retrospective dedicated to American actor Buster Keaton was shown at the festival.

Jury
The following people were announced as being on the jury for the festival:
 Lia van Leer, founder of Jerusalem Cinematheque-Israel Film Archive and Jerusalem Film Festival (Israel) - Jury President
 Georgi Djulgerov, director, screenwriter and producer (Bulgaria)
 Siqin Gaowa, actress (China)
 Alfred Hirschmeier, production designer (Germany)
 Christiane Hörbiger, actress (Austria)
 Vadim Yusov, director of photography (Russia)
 Dave Kehr, film critic (United States)
 Michael Kutza, founder of the Chicago International Film Festival (United States)
 Pilar Miró, director and screenwriter (Spain)
 Tsai Ming-liang, director and screenwriter (Taiwan)

Films in competition
The following films were in competition for the Golden Bear and Silver Bear awards:

Key
{| class="wikitable" width="550" colspan="1"
| style="background:#FFDEAD;" align="center"| †
|Winner of the main award for best film in its section
|}

Awards

The following prizes were awarded by the Jury:
 Golden Bear: The Bait by Bertrand Tavernier
 Silver Bear – Special Jury Prize: Smoke, Harvey Keitel
 Silver Bear for Best Director: Richard Linklater for Before Sunrise
 Silver Bear for Best Actress: Josephine Siao for Xiatian De Xue
 Silver Bear for Best Actor: Paul Newman for Nobody's Fool
 Silver Bear for an outstanding single achievement: Hong fen
 Silver Bear: Pyesa dlya passazhira
 Honourable Mention:
 El callejón de los milagros by Jorge Fons
 Colpo di luna by Alberto Simone
 Sh'Chur by Shmuel Hasfari
 Blue Angel Award: Ti kniver i hjertet by Marius Holst
 Honorary Golden Bear: Alain Delon

References

External links
45th Berlin International Film Festival 1995
1995 Berlin International Film Festival
Berlin International Film Festival:1995 at Internet Movie Database

45
1995 film festivals
1995 in Berlin
Berl
Berlin